

The following is a list of the exports of the United Kingdom. 

The UK exports to 160 nations.
The UK is the fifth largest exporter. 

Data is for 2019, in millions of USD (United States dollars), as reported by International Trade Centre. Currently the top fifty exports are listed.

References
 International Trade Centre - International Trade Statistics (2019) - Monthly, quarterly and yearly trade data. Import & export values, volumes, growth rates, market shares, etc.

Foreign trade of the United Kingdom
United Kingdom
Exports